|
Barras Futebol Club, commonly known as Barras, is a Brazilian football club based in Barras, Piauí state. They competed in the Série C twice and competed in the Copa do Brasil once.

History
The club was founded on November 15, 2004. Barras won the Campeonato Piauiense in 2008. They competed in the Série C in 2007, when they reached the Final Stage, finishing in the 7th position, but failing to gain promotion to the following year's Série B, and in 2008, when they were eliminated in the First Stage of the competition. Barras will play against ABC in the First Round of the 2011 Copa do Brasil.

Achievements

 Campeonato Piauiense:
 Winners (1): 2008

Stadium
Barras Futebol Club play their home games at Estádio Juca Fortes. The stadium has a maximum capacity of 4,870 people.

References

External links
 Official website

Association football clubs established in 2004
Football clubs in Piauí
2004 establishments in Brazil